St. Ann's Garrison, or more commonly known as "The Garrison", is a small district located in the country of Barbados.  This Garrison Historic Area is situated about 2 miles south of Heroes Square in the capital-city Bridgetown, and just west of the village of Hastings in the neighbouring parish of Christ Church.  It is dominated by its historic horse race-track, located on the 30 acre parade ground called the Garrison Savannah.  The Garrison area additionally contains many historic buildings including barracks for military personnel.  The district is bisected by Highway 7, with Saint Ann's Fort, where the Barbados Defence Force (BDF) is based, lying to the west.

History

During both the eighteenth and nineteenth centuries the Garrison was the base and headquarters for members of the British West India Regiment in Barbados.  In 1751, the future leader of the American Revolution and first president of the United States, George Washington, stayed with his sick brother at the district's Bush Hill section for six weeks. This restored property remains as a fixture at the Garrison where it is simply called the 'George Washington House'. By the middle of the eighteenth century, wealthy prominent Barbadians and regiment troops started the sporting tradition of horse racing at the Garrison racetrack.

On 30 November 1966 the Garrison Historic Area was the location where the ceremony was held for the lowering of the Union Flag (the flag of the United Kingdom), and the raising of the Barbados flag, thus ushering in full independence for the country of Barbados from the United Kingdom.

There are a number of historically significant buildings at the location, other than George Washington House. Many of these housed the Regiment units of the British Garrison, including the building that houses the Barbados Museum and surrounding buildings. Evidence of this includes prison cells of the former Garrison.

Gallery

See also
 Barbados Defence Force
 Barbados Regiment
 Militia (British Dominions and Crown Colonies)
 West India Regiment
 Leeward Islands Station
 List of historic buildings in Bridgetown and Saint Ann's Garrison

Notes

References
 
 
Garrison is world heritage site 
Great Cannons of Barbados, by M. Hartland
The Garrison, Heritage Tours

External links
Barbados' UNESCO World Heritage application
Bridgetown and its Garrison – UNESCO World Heritage Centre
History of the Barbados Rifle Association

Saint Michael, Barbados
Military of Barbados
Districts of Barbados
Historic sites in Barbados